Kestopur (officially, Krishnapur) is a neighborhood of Kolkata in North 24 Parganas district in the Indian state of West Bengal. It is under Bidhannagar Municipal Corporation and also a part of the area covered by Kolkata Metropolitan Development Authority (KMDA).

Kestopur lies on Kazi Nazrul Islam Sarani, more commonly known as VIP Road, which connects the area with Dumdum/Kolkata Airport. The community is made up of people of various religions from different states. Kestopur has over the years become an area of great prominence because of its proximity to areas like Salt Lake and New Town. VIP Road-Kestopur crossing was one of the busiest of the Kazi Nazrul Islam Sarani. However the construction of a flyover along with subway at the crossing (the subway was opened on 24 June 2014 and the flyover on 8 March 2015) helps in decongesting the traffic at the junction and nearby areas.

Education
St. Francis Academy 
The Assembly Of God Church School
Krishnapur JNMC High School
Neli Sengupta Bhavan & Deshapriya Balika Bidya Mandir
Vaishno devi academy

Transport

On the eastern side of VIP Road, Kestopur Main Road serves as an important connector for New Town, Narkelbagan and Saltlake Sector V. On the eastern side, Prafullakanan road serves heavily populated areas of Dumdum park, Shyamnagar, which terminates at Jessore Road.

Finally, after a delay of 15 long years, the Salt Lake - Kestopur gap was bridged. On 25 September 2022, the much-awaited Salt Lake - Kestopur Bridge was inaugurated alleviating the inconvenience of the people by reducing the distance between Salt Lake and Kestopur to a mere 36 meters. Previously, residents of Kestopur had to enter Salt Lake through either of the two ways,  Lake Town Bailey Bridge or Newtown and both of them were time-consuming lengthy routes. The bridge has been opened between AK Block of Salt Lake and Samarpally of Kestopur. This new facility is  especially aiding motorists moving towards the airport as the travel time has got substantially cut down. The 36-metre-long bridge has two lanes along with footpaths on both sides to facilitate vehicles from Salt Lake to enter VIP Road and vice versa without having to move all the way towards Ultadanga or Chinar Park. Residents living in the Sector II area of Salt Lake as well as those commuting from Baguiati and the airport will benefit from this new development. Previously, all airport-bound vehicles from Salt Lake's Sector I and Sector II areas had to move towards Ultadanga and then take the VIP Road to move towards the airport.

Police station
 Newtown PS 
Bidhannagar PS
Baguiati PS

References

Cities and towns in North 24 Parganas district
Neighbourhoods in North 24 Parganas district
Neighbourhoods in Kolkata
Kolkata Metropolitan Area